Romano Benito Floriani Mussolini (born 27 January 2003), also referred to as Mussolini Jr. by Italian media, is an Italian professional footballer who plays as a right-back or right midfielder for  club Lazio.

He is the son of politician Alessandra Mussolini, the grandson of pianist Romano Mussolini and the great-grandson of the Italian fascist dictator Benito Mussolini.

Early life 
Floriani Mussolini was born in 2003 as the third child of Mauro Floriani and former politician Alessandra Mussolini. His mother's father, Romano Mussolini, was a pianist, and her grandfather was Italian fascist dictator Benito Mussolini.

He has a double surname as a result. This was done as an exception to Italian name customs with Italian civil authorities and the Roman Catholic Church agreeing to it at his baptism as double surnames were not usually allowed under Italian law at the time of his birth.

Career 
Floriani Mussolini started his football career by playing in the youth teams at Roma, before moving to play for Lazio when he was 13. Whilst at Lazio, he was loaned out in 2018 to amateur club Vigor Perconti. This came after he did not get any game time at Lazio for two years before he made his debut for the under-17s.

In 2021, Floriani Mussolini gained worldwide attention for playing for Lazio, due to the club's supporters' traditional association with neo-fascism. When asked if the player's name would limit his playing time, Lazio's youth coach Mauro Bianchessi stated: "The burdensome surname? I’ve never spoken to his parents, and the only thing that matters is whether a player deserves to play. Nothing else." In March 2021, Floriani Mussolini signed a professional senior contract with Lazio until 2024.

He was first called-up to Lazio's first team on 24 October 2021, in a Serie A game against Hellas Verona as an unused substitute.

Personal life 
Floriani Mussolini gained attention after appearing on television with his mother on Ballando con le Stelle. In spite of his surname and lineage, Floriani Mussolini stated he has no interest in politics. He was educated at St. George's British International School in Rome, and signed for Lazio whilst still studying.

References 

2003 births
Living people
Footballers from Rome
Italian footballers
Association football fullbacks
Association football midfielders
A.S. Roma players
S.S. Lazio players

Mussolini family